This is a list of the major seed packet companies. Seed packets or packages include seeds for flowers, fruit, or vegetables and are typically sold to amateur gardeners. The seed packets generally include plant information and planting instructions on the label.

Back to the Roots, established in 2009
Botanical Interests, established in 1995
Burpee Seeds, established in 1876
D. Landreth Seed Company, established 1784
 Fedco Seeds, established in 1978
 Ferry-Morse Seed Company, established in 1856
 Gurney's Seed and Nursery Company, established in 1866
Harris Seeds, established in 1879
Hudson Valley Seed Company, established in 2009
J.W. Jung Seed Company, established in 1907
 McKenzie Seeds, established in 1896
 Park Seed Company, established in 1868
 R. H. Shumway, established in 1870
 Seeds of Change, established in 1989
 Southern Exposure Seed Exchange, established in 1983
 True Leaf Market, established in 1974
 Wildseed Farms, established in 1983

See also 
 Seed company

References

Seed companies
Lists of companies by industry